This article presents a timeline of hypertext technology, including "hypermedia" and related human–computer interaction projects and developments from 1945 on. The term hypertext is credited to the author and philosopher Ted Nelson.

See also Graphical user interface, Multimedia; also 
Paul Otlet and Henri La Fontaine's Mundaneum, a massively cross-referenced card index system established in 1910.

1940s
 1941
 Jorge Luis Borges' "The Garden of Forking Paths"
 1945
 Memex (concept by Vannevar Bush)

1960s
 1960
 Project Xanadu (concept)
 1962
 Marshall McLuhan's The Gutenberg Galaxy uses the term surfing
 1967
 Hypertext Editing System (HES) by Andries van Dam and Ted Nelson at Brown University
 1968
 FRESS (File Retrieval and Editing System, successor to HES)
 NLS (oN-Line System)

1970s
 1972
 ZOG
 1973
 Xerox Alto desktop
 1976
 PROMIS
 1978
 Aspen Movie Map
 1979
 PERQ

1980s
 1980
 ENQUIRE (not released)
 1981
 Electronic Document System (EDS, aka Document Presentation System)
 Kussmaul Encyclopedia
 Xerox Star desktop
 1982
 Guide
 1983
 Knowledge Management System (KMS, successor to ZOG)
 TIES (The Interactive Encyclopedia System, later HyperTies)
 1984
 NoteCards
 1985
 Intermedia (successor to FRESS and EDS)
 Symbolics Document Examiner (Symbolics workstations)
 1986
 Texinfo
 TextNet (a network-based approach to text handling)
 Neptune (a hypertext system for CAD applications)
 1987
 Macromedia Authorware
 Canon Cat ("Leap" function, interface)
 HyperCard
 Knowledge Navigator (concept described by former Apple Computer CEO John Sculley in his book Odyssey)
 Storyspace
 1988
 Microcosm (hypermedia system) (University of Southampton)
 1989
 Macromedia Director
 Information Management: a proposal, Tim Berners-Lee, CERN

1990s
 1990
 DynaText
 World Wide Web
 Hyperland (BBC documentary written by Douglas Adams)
 ToolBook
 HyTelnet
 WinHelp
 1991
 Gopher
 AmigaGuide
 1995
 Wiki
 1996
 Hyperwire (Kinetix)
 1998
 Everything2
 XML
 1999
 RSS

2000s
 2001
 Wikipedia
 2014
 OpenXanadu, an implementation of Project Xanadu
 2019
 Gemini, a lightweight complement to the Web

Hypertext
Hypertext
Hypertext

es:Hipertexto#Historia